Prostanthera oleoides is a species of flowering plant that is endemic to central Queensland. It is an open, erect shrub with four-sided branchlets, narrow elliptic, oblong or egg-shaped leaves with the narrower end towards the base, and mauve flowers with purple to dark mauve markings.

Description

Taxonomy
Prostanthera oleoides was first formally described in 2015 by Trevor Wilson and Barry Conn in the journal Telopea, based on material collected in the Blackdown Tableland National Park.

Distribution and habitat
This prostanthera occurs on the central Queensland sandstone belt in the Blackdown Tableland, Expedition and Chesterton Range National Parks where it grows in soil derived from sandstone, on and below sandstone escarpments.

Conservation status
This mintbush is classified as of "least concern" under the Queensland Government Nature Conservation Act 1992.

References

oleoides
Flora of Queensland
Lamiales of Australia
Plants described in 2015
Taxa named by Barry John Conn